Roberto Cláudio Rodrigues Bezerra is a Brazilian politician, the former mayor of Fortaleza, the fifth largest city in Brazil, from 2013 to 2021.

Roberto Cláudio (as he is known in politics) is a doctor, graduated from the Federal University of Ceará, in Fortaleza, and has a PhD degree in Public Health from the University of Arizona, in the United States.

He was elected mayor of Fortaleza in the second round of the municipal elections held on October 28, 2012.

Electoral history

See also
 List of mayors of Fortaleza

References 

Mayors of Fortaleza
Members of the Legislative Assembly of Ceará
Living people
Year of birth missing (living people)
Federal University of Ceará alumni
University of Arizona alumni